Bernard Greene (September 28, 1965 – January 21, 2023), also known as B.G. the Prince of Rap, was an American rapper and Eurodance artist. He experienced modest success in Germany, where he lived after being posted by the U.S. Army.

Early life
Greene was born in Washington, D.C., United States. He joined the United States Army after graduating from high school and was posted to Germany in 1985.

Musical career
His biggest hit came in 1991, when he reached number one on the US Hot Dance Music/Club Play chart with "This Beat Is Hot". The single made it to number 72 on the U.S. Billboard Hot 100, and number 54 on the U.S. Billboard Hot Black singles chart.  He followed that up with "Take Control of The Party", which reached number 2 on the dance chart the following year. This track also peaked at number 71 in the UK Singles Chart in January 1992. He had a few more hits in the 1990s: "The Power of Rhythm", "Can We Get Enough?", "The Colour of My Dreams", and "Stomp!".

Death 
Greene died in Wiesbaden on January 21, 2023, at the age of 57. He has been suffering from prostate cancer in the last years.

Discography

Studio albums

Singles

See also
 List of Number 1 Dance Hits (United States)
 List of artists who reached number one on the US Dance chart

References

External links
 

1965 births
2023 deaths
Military personnel from Washington, D.C.
Musicians from Washington, D.C.
American house musicians
American dance musicians
Eurodance musicians
Deaths from prostate cancer